Alder Springs (formerly, Oriental) is a set of springs and an unincorporated community in Glenn County, California.

The Oriental post office opened in 1888, changed its name to Alder Springs in 1917, and closed for good in 1940.

Alder Springs is the location of the California Department of Corrections and Rehabilitation Valley View Conservation Camp. This fire camp of approximately 115 inmates operates under a joint agreement of the California Department of Correction and Rehabilitation and the California Department of Forestry and Fire Protection.

The Berkeley Seismology Laboratory of the University of California, Berkeley has strong motion sensor for detecting seismic activity here in addition to a short period sensor operated by the California Department of Water Resources. There is also a nearby National Oceanic and Atmospheric Administration weather station.

References

Reference bibliography 

Unincorporated communities in California
Unincorporated communities in Glenn County, California